Jack Paul Concannon (born 26 January 2000) is an English footballer who plays for  side Alvechurch, where he plays as a midfielder.

Playing career

Birmingham City
Concannon was born in Hagley, Worcestershire. He joined Birmingham City F.C.'s Academy at the age of seven, worked his way up through the youth system, and took up a two-year scholarship in July 2016. Academy coach Steve Spooner described him as "a very good central midfielder that has great understanding of the game both technically and tactically [with] a good engine [and] competitive". In his first year, he scored four goals in 19 appearances for Birmingham's under-18 team, and in his second, he helped Birmingham's youth team reach the semi-final of the 2017–18 FA Youth Cup, and played in both legs as Chelsea outclassed Birmingham 7–0 on aggregate. Where other second-year scholars were offered professional contracts, concerns about Concannon's lack of physicality meant he received a third scholarship year.

Sutton Coldfield Town (loan)
Concannon was anxious to go out on loan to demonstrate his ability to cope physically in men's football, and signed for Sutton Coldfield Town of the Southern League Division One Central on work experience in August 2018.

Tamworth (loan)
He moved up a level to join Southern League Premier Division Central side Tamworth on an initial one-month loan on 14 December 2018. He made his Tamworth debut on 22 December in a league fixture at home to St Ives Town, which the away side won 2–1, and coped sufficiently well with men's football that his loan deal was systematically extended to the end of the season, during which he scored five goals from 21 league appearances. The club's manager, Gary Smith, was appreciative: "He's been a fantastic player for us, someone with a great attitude and appetite for the game. He's still learning and growing in stature but he has been absolutely fantastic – a really clever player with great feet."

Return to Birmingham City

On 24 May 2019, Concannon signed his first professional contract with Birmingham City, of one year. He was an unused substitute for the first team on 1 February 2020, and made his competitive debut for Birmingham three days later in the starting eleven for the FA Cup fourth-round replay against Coventry City. He was booked for a foul after 26 minutes and was substituted after 57 minutes for Jérémie Bela. The score was 2–2 after extra time, and Birmingham won the tie on penalties.

Concannon signed another one-year contract in July 2020. He had no further matchday involvement with the first team, and in May 2021, Birmingham confirmed that Concannon would leave the club when his contract expired at the end of the season.

Tamworth

Concannon re-signed for Southern League Premier Division Central side Tamworth on 9 August 2021. Concannon made his second debut for Tamworth on 14 August 2021, the opening day of the Southern League Premier Division Central season away at Royston Town, playing the full match in a disappointing 3-0 defeat for his new side.

Concannon starred in the following Southern League Premier Division Central fixture on 17 August 2021 at home to Coalville Town, as he scored his first goal of the season to tie the scores at 1-1, finishing a lovely shot from outside the area, the match finished 1-1.

Jack performed very well again in the clubs next Southern League Premier Division Central fixture at home to Lowestoft Town on 21 August 2021. Tamworth sealed a very impressive 6-1 victory, and despite a Dan Creaney hat trick, Concannon was named man of the match.

Concannon's second goal for Tamworth came on 26 March 2022, in a home Southern League Premier Division Central match against Needham Market. Jack was introduced as a 75th minute substitute for the already cautioned Gift Mussa and capped off an impressive 5-2 victory for the club, scoring the final goal of the match deep into injury time.

Alvechurch
On 13 June 2022, Concannon was announced as signing for fellow Southern League Premier Division Central side Alvechurch.

Career statistics

References

External links

2000 births
Living people
Sportspeople from Worcestershire
English footballers
Association football midfielders
Birmingham City F.C. players
Sutton Coldfield Town F.C. players
Tamworth F.C. players
Alvechurch F.C. players
Southern Football League players